Club Deportivo Atlético Juvenil  is a Salvadoran professional football club based in Jocoaitique, Morazán,  El Salvador.

The club currently plays in the Tercera Division de Fútbol Salvadoreño.

Football clubs in El Salvador